A tong is a type of organization found among Chinese immigrants predominantly living in the United States, with smaller numbers in Canada, Australia, and the United Kingdom. In Chinese, the word tong means "hall" or "gathering place". These organizations are described as secret societies or sworn brotherhoods and are often tied to criminal activity.  In the 1990s, in most American Chinatowns, clearly marked tong halls could easily be found, many of which have had affiliations with Chinese organized crime.

These associations often provide services for Chinatown communities such as immigrant counseling, Chinese schools, and English classes for adults. Tongs follow the pattern of secret societies common to southern China and many are connected to a secret society called the Tiandihui, which follows this pattern. Other groups worldwide that follow this pattern and are connected with the Tiandihui are known as hui, Hongmen, and triads.

History
Tongs first appeared in China in 1644 when the Ming dynasty was overthrown by the Qing dynasty. One of the first tongs was established by the secret society Chee Kung Tong, which aimed to restore the power of the Ming dynasty by removing the new Manchu rulers of the Qing dynasty. These Zhigongtang tongs were located in the province of Guangdong, which was home to many of the first Chinese migrants heading to the United States—some of whom would take with them the notion of a tong as an organization to set up there.

Establishment of tongs in various Asian countries
After the 17th century, large numbers of Chinese, particularly from the Fujian and Canton areas, left China to seek their fortunes in Southeast Asia and Taiwan. These Chinese immigrants quickly formed a trader and merchant class in many societies in various Asian countries such as the Philippines, Indonesia, and Malaysia.

Tongs in English-speaking countries
Before the 1840s, very few Chinese had emigrated to the United States, Canada, or Australia. However, by the mid-19th-century Chinese immigrant numbers dramatically increased. Beginning with a few hundred immigrants, their numbers increased to an estimated hundreds of thousands of Chinese immigrants.

Former Taiping Heavenly Kingdom military commander Yang Fuqing is alleged to have fled to the United States following the rebel state's defeat and started a secret society in Los Angeles.

Tongs in America 
After settling in San Francisco and other California cities, Chinese workers faced hostility from their American peers who felt threatened by their willingness to work for lower wages. As labor unions and angered workers became more aggressive, many Chinese felt pressure to leave and go east, where they heard life would be less dangerous. As a result, many Chinese immigrants moved to cities such as New York, Philadelphia, and Boston. Today these cities still have ethnic Chinese communities large enough to have developed Chinatowns. They have also been joined by new immigrants of the late 20th and early 21st centuries.

Many Chinese soon organized voluntary benevolent associations for support and protection. These are usually formed by people originating in their district in China, family name, or depending on what native dialect, for example in the case of Hakka speakers, or sworn brotherhoods. The tongs provided services for immigrants such as employment and housing opportunities. They also helped resolve individual and group disputes within the community. Many of these volunteer societies did not have the financial ability to fund community events or look after their members, and those that did tended to focus inward and provide help only to their own members. As a result, many tongs with little or no hereditary financial value had to either disband or operate criminal activities such as gambling houses and  prostitution. This transformed them from benevolent associations to providers of illegal services. The term tong became unfavorably associated with the secret brotherhoods in Chinatowns, and they often battled with other associations in that area. Tongs were usually composed of young men, some with criminal backgrounds, or outcasts who had been expelled from their associations. Notably, many of the traditional tong activities, such as gambling, were legal in China, but not in North America.

Early Chinese populations in the United States and Canada were overwhelmingly male, especially after sex-restrictive immigration laws were passed in 1882 in the U.S. and 1923 in Canada, respectively (see Chinese Exclusion Act and Chinese Immigration Act, 1923). For this reason tongs participated heavily in importing women from China for both marriage and prostitution. Many of these women did not come to America by choice, and some were deceived and forced into prostitution by procurers. Tongs associated with importing women to America fought over territories and profits. This became known as the "Tong Wars", which were a series of violent attacks between two branches of the Tong Gang, the Hip Sing Tong and On Leong Tong. The reasons for this conflict vary, from struggles over territory to assassinations of members. The "Tong Wars" of the 19th and early 20th centuries were often based on control of these women. In the early years the tongs employed "hatchet men" or boo how doy, also called highbinders, as hired killers to fight the street battles that ensued over turf, business and women.

San Francisco, California 
San Francisco was the home of the first Tong in the United States; it formed in reaction to the hostility that Chinese immigrants faced from American workers upon their arrival to America. In Bill Lee's memoirs in "The Chinese Playground", which recalls the activities of the Tong Gang in San Francisco, he states that the oppression Chinese immigrants faced led them to turn to the Tong for protection. While it is true that the Tong offered protection, it is unclear if this protection was forced as a means to gain control of territory for the distribution of the group's illicit activities. During the plague outbreak in Chinatown of San Francisco in the 1900s, the Chinese Six Companies recommended the vaccination plan to their members and the tongs. Doubting the effectiveness of vaccinations, many Chinese residents of Chinatown refused inoculations. Several tongs went so far as to threaten harm to those who did get vaccinated, as well as the Chinese leadership that endorsed doing so.

Structure and aims
Tongs in North America showed many similarities to the triads of Hong Kong and British colonies in Southeast Asia. These included similar initiation ceremonies and paying respect to the same deities. This is because both are similar organizations that follow the patterns of southern Chinese secret societies and sworn brotherhoods. The triad societies were underground organizations in British colonies that also existed for self-help of members, but spoke of the overthrow of the Qing dynasty. Ko-lin Chin outlined that most tongs have similar organization and have a headquarters where one can find a president, a vice president, a secretary, a treasurer, an auditor, and several elders and public relations administrators. Today their main aims are to care for their members and their respective communities.

Notable Chinese tongs
Bing Kong Tong, California, Washington
Hip Sing Tong, New York and branches in 13 other states
On Leong Tong, New York
Suey Sing Tong, California, Oregon, Washington, U.S. and British Columbia, Canada
Hop Sing Tong, California, Oregon, Washington, Idaho, Colorado.

See also
Hui
Secret society
Tong Wars
Triad (organized crime)
Tiandihui
List of Chinese criminal organizations
List of criminal enterprises, gangs, and syndicates

References

Bibliography 
 Chin, Ko-lin. Chinatown Gangs: Extortion, Enterprise, and Ethnicity. Oxford University Press, 2000 
 Chin, Ko-lin. "Chinatowns and Tongs". In Chinese Subculture and Criminality: Non-Traditional Crime Groups in America. New York: Greenwood Press, 1990, pp. 47–66
 Dillon, Richard H. The Hatchet Men: The Story of the Tong Wars in San Francisco's Chinatown. New York: Coward-McCann, 1962, p. 18
 Ebrey, Patricia Buckley. The Cambridge Illustrated History of China. New York: Cambridge University Press, 1999
 "Tong War (United States history)" - Britannica Online Encyclopedia. http://www.britannica.com/EBchecked/topic/599143/tong-war (accessed February 12, 2011)
 Huston, Peter. Tongs, Gangs, and Triads: Chinese Crime Groups in North America. Boulder, Colorado: Paladin Press, 1995
 Chan, Sucheng; Hsu, Madeline Y. Chinese Americans and the Politics of Race and Culture. Temple University Press, 2008
 Asian Organized Crime Groups - Chinese - Tongs and Street Gangs
 SF Weekly Feature Article Profiling Member of Hop Sing Tong -- Raymond "Shrimp Boy" Chow (2007)
 Tongs Encyclopedia of Chicago

Organized crime groups in Canada
Organized crime groups in the United States
Cantonese words and phrases
 
Secret societies related to organized crime
Transnational organized crime